Olive Tell (September 27, 1894 – June 8, 1951) was a stage and screen actress from New York City.

Biography
Tell was educated in several cities in Europe. She and her younger actress sister Alma graduated from the American Academy of Dramatic Arts in 1915. The sisters began appearing in Broadway theaters around 1918. Olive made her New York debut in the drama Husband and Wife. At first, she preferred acting in theater and detested her work on screen.

She first appeared in motion pictures during World War I. Her early screen roles were in silent films, including The Silent Master (1917), The Unforeseen (1917), Her Sister (1917), and National Red Cross Pageant (1917). Tell appeared with popular film actors of the era such as Donald Gallaher, Karl Dane, Ann Little, Rod La Rocque, Ethel Barrymore and a young Tallulah Bankhead.

Her first husband was killed in World War I. Tell married George Willis Kreh in April 1923; he died four months later; she married First National Pictures movie producer Henry Morgan Hobart in 1926. Hobart and Tell moved to California in 1926 and stayed in Hollywood for 12 years.

Her final screen credits came in the late 1930s. She performed in In His Steps (1936), Polo Joe (1936) with Joe E. Brown, Easy to Take (1936), and Under Southern Stars (1937). Tell's final screen appearance was in the drama Zaza (1939), directed by George Cukor.

Olive Tell died in Bellevue Hospital in 1951 after suffering a fractured skull at the Dryden Hotel, 150 East Thirty-Ninth Street, New York City, where she resided. She was 56 years old.

Partial filmography

 The Silent Master (1917) - Miss Virginia Arlen
 The Unforseen (1917) - Margaret Fielding
 Her Sister (1917) - Eleanor Alderson
 National Red Cross Pageant (1917) - Louvain - Flemish episode
 The Girl and the Judge (1918) - Winifred Stanton
 To Hell with the Kaiser! (1918) - Alice Monroe
 Secret Strings (1918) - Janet Newell
 The Trap (1919) - Jean Carson - the Schoolteacher Heroine
 Love Without Question (1920) based on the novel "The Abandoned Room" by Charles Wadsworth Camp - Katherine
 A Woman's Business (1920) - Barbara
 Wings of Pride (1920) - Olive Muir
 Clothes (1920) - Olivia Sherwood
 The Wrong Woman (1920) - Viola Sherwin
 Worlds Apart (1921) - Elinor Ashe
 Chickie (1925) - Ila Moore
 Womanhandled (1925) - Lucy Chatham
 Prince of Tempters (1926) - Duchess of Chatsfield
 Summer Bachelors (1926) - Mrs. Preston Smith
 Slaves of Beauty (1927) - Anastasia Jones
 Sailors' Wives (1928) - Careth Lindsey
 Soft Living (1928) - Mrs. Rodney S. Bowen
 The Trial of Mary Dugan (1929) - Mrs. Gertrude Rice
 Hearts in Exile (1929) - Annna Reskova
 The Very Idea (1929) - Marion Green
 Cock o' the Walk (1930) - Rosa Vallejo
 Lawful Larceny (1930) - Vivan Hepburn
 The Right of Way (1931) - Kathleen
 Ten Cents a Dance (1931) - Mrs. Carlton
 Woman Hungry (1931) - Betty Temple
 Ladies' Man (1931) - Mrs. Fendley
 Devotion (1931) - Mrs. Trent
 Delicious (1931) - Mrs. Van Bergh
 False Faces (1932) - Mrs. Day (uncredited)
 Strictly Personal (1933) - Mrs. Castleton
 The Witching Hour (1934) - Mrs. Helen Thorne
 The Scarlet Empress (1934) - Princess Johanna Elizabeth
 Private Scandal (1934) - Deborah Lane
 Baby Take a Bow (1934) - Mrs. Carson
 Four Hours to Kill! (1935) - Mrs. Madison
 Shanghai (1935) - Mrs. Hilton
 Brilliant Marriage (1936) - Mrs. Jane Taylor
 Yours for the Asking (1936) - Society Woman (uncredited)
 In His Steps (1936) - Elaine Brewster
 Polo Joe (1936) - Mrs. Hilton
 Easy to Take (1936) - Announcer (uncredited)
 Zaza (1939) - Jeanne Liseron (uncredited) (final film role)

References

Los Angeles Times, "Olive Tell In Stage Return", March 25, 1928, Page C15.
New York Times, "Olive Tell, Appeared On Stage And Screen", June 9, 1951, Page 19.

External links 

1894 births
1951 deaths
American stage actresses
American film actresses
American silent film actresses
Actresses from New York City
20th-century American actresses